Emmet McLoughlin (also spelled Emmet McLaughlin) (6 October 1922 – 26 February 1988) was an amateur football player who represented Ireland at the 1948 London Olympic Games. He also represented the Ireland Amateur team selected by the IFA.

McLoughlin came from Inishowen in County Donegal and grew up in and around the towns of Moville and Carndonagh. However, some sources give his birthplace as Derry. At the time of the 1948 Olympics he was a medical student at University College Dublin and was attached to the Mater Private Hospital in Dublin. In January 1948 he played for the hospital football team in a challenge match against Belfast's Mater Infirmorum Hospital at Celtic Park. At the time of the Olympics, McLoughlin is listed as a UCD player.

On 26 July 1948 he played as an inside-right for Ireland at the 1948 Olympic Football Tournament. He featured in the 3–1 defeat against the Netherlands played at Fratton Park. Brendan O'Kelly, who scored Ireland's only goal, like McLoughlin, also played for Bohemians and UCD.

McLoughlin joined Portadown in 1951, scoring on his début against Crusaders on 27 January 1951. While at Portadown he represented the Ireland Amateur team on three occasions, played in games against England, Scotland and the Gold Coast.

McLoughlin later emigrated to England.

References

External links
 
   Northern Ireland's Footballing Greats

1922 births
1988 deaths
Republic of Ireland association footballers
Association footballers from County Donegal
League of Ireland players
Derry City F.C. players
Dundalk F.C. players
Portadown F.C. players
Shelbourne F.C. players
Bohemian F.C. players
University College Dublin A.F.C. players
Footballers at the 1948 Summer Olympics
Olympic footballers of Ireland
Alumni of University College Dublin
Association football inside forwards
Sportspeople from Derry (city)
St James's Gate F.C. players